The State Fund for Development of İnformation Technologies, operating under the Ministry of Communications and High Technologies of the Republic of Azerbaijan, is an Azerbaijan state organization that stimulates and finances innovation and development in the field of information and communication technology (ICT).

Establishment 
The State Fund for Development of İnformation Technologies was established by decree No. 2095 of the President of Azerbaijan, on 15 March 2012. It operates under the Ministry of Communications and High Technologies, to stimulate innovation and development in the field of information and communication technology, as well as providing financial assistance for applied scientific research in the field. Financing is provided through investment, low-interest loans, and grants.

Financial activities 
The resources of the Fund are directed at the financing of investment and competition in the development of the information and communication technologies (ICT) sector. The Fund uses the following mechanisms in the financing of its projects:

 Capital investment in companies operating in the ICT sector.
 Loans through authorized bank and non-bank credit institutions, with concessional credits.
 Grant financing of innovative and operative scientific-technical startup projects.

Objectives 
The objectives of the Fund are to promote development in the field of ICT in Azerbaijan, through supporting applied scientific research in the field, encouraging entrepreneurship, supporting entrepreneurial endeavors by facilitating domestic and foreign investment, and ensuring the integration of new technologies into the local economy.

 To ensure the efficient and proper use of the fund's assets.
 To explore export-oriented projects in the field of ICT.
 To finance projects to enhance the performance of citizens in foreign markets.
 To transform innovations in the field of ICT into business projects.
 To expand the use of concessional financial resources, of banks and non-bank authorized credit institutions, to support promising small- and medium-sized ICT businesses.
 To enhance local shareholder participation in the authorized capital of ICT stock companies.
 To attract investments and facilitate production and technological cooperation with foreign investors.
 To make recommendations for analyzing and improving the investment climate.
 To take measures to attract financial resources to the Fund.
 To facilitate the integration of new technologies into the local economy.
 To stimulate local entrepreneurship in the field of ICT.
 To finance the creation and development of technology parks, business incubators and other innovative infrastructure units.
 On the basis of competition, to choose innovative and operative scientific-technical startups to support.
 To financially support such startups by grant funding in the following spheres of the ICT sector:
 preparation of advanced software.
 preparation of product samples.
 development of innovative infrastructure projects.
 creation of information systems projects using modern technologies.
 expansion of ICT services, including the development of Internet services.
 To audit Fund investments.
 To give preferential financing to state programs which aim at the development of ICT.
 To determine minimum requirements, conditions of competitions, and evaluation criteria of investment projects.
 To participate in the preparation and implementation of local and regional programs and investment projects in the field of ICT.
 To ensure the correct use of resources allocated by the Fund, to take measures in accordance with the law to suspend the financing and recovery of allocated funds not properly used.
 To organize conferences, seminars, exhibitions, and other local and international events related to the Fund's activities.
 To act as a mediator between entrepreneurs and ICT innovators and provide them with business consulting and other expert services.
 To stimulate the training of personnel, to create a database of talented young people, young ICT professionals, and scholars.
 To inform people about the Fund's performance, to create a website, on which information prescribed by law will be disclosed and updated.
 To engage in advertising and publishing activities, prescribed by law, to stimulate the development of entrepreneurship in the field of ICT.
 To carry out other tasks defined by the acts of the President of Azerbaijan.

References

External links

2012 establishments in Azerbaijan
Economy of Azerbaijan
Government agencies of Azerbaijan
Sovereign wealth funds